Despicable Me 2 is a 2013 American computer-animated comedy film produced by Illumination Entertainment and distributed by Universal Pictures. The sequel to Despicable Me (2010), it was directed by Chris Renaud and Pierre Coffin, and written by Cinco Paul and Ken Daurio. It stars the voices of Steve Carell, Kristen Wiig, Benjamin Bratt, Miranda Cosgrove, Russell Brand, and Ken Jeong. The film follows Gru as he is recruited by secret agent Lucy Wilde, who is investigating a theft of the mutagen PX-41, stolen from the Arctic Circle. During their investigations, they extract El Macho, a supervillain with the goal of achieving world domination after faking his death.

Despicable Me 2 debuted in Australia on June 5, 2013, and was theatrically released in the United States on July 3, by Universal Pictures. It received generally positive reviews from critics and earned $970.8 million worldwide, becoming the third-highest-grossing film of 2013 and the most profitable film in the 101-year history of Universal Pictures. It was nominated for two awards at the 86th Academy Awards, and received numerous other accolades. It is the second entry in the Despicable Me franchise, which includes Minions (2015), Despicable Me 3 (2017), Minions: The Rise of Gru (2022), and Despicable Me 4 (2024).

Plot

A mysterious aircraft steals a highly potent mutagen known as PX-41 from a secret laboratory in the Arctic Circle. Silas Ramsbottom, director of the Anti-Villain League (AVL), sends agent Lucy Wilde, to recruit former supervillain Gru. Gru is forcibly brought to the AVL headquarters and asked by Ramsbottom to help them track down the culprit and recover the mutagen. However, Gru refuses, claiming that he is now a legitimate father and owner of a jelly-producing business. Longing to resume his criminal life, Dr. Nefario, Gru's friend and assistant, leaves him for new employment. This causes a reluctant Gru to investigate the theft and work with Lucy. The pair are stationed at the Paradise Shopping Mall, with a cupcake store as their front.

Gru immediately suspects Mexican restaurant owner Eduardo Pérez might be "El Macho", a supervillain who supposedly died by riding a shark into an active volcano with 250 pounds of TNT strapped to his chest. Gru and Lucy break into Eduardo's restaurant at night but find no evidence. Meanwhile, Gru's three adopted daughters, Margo, Edith, and Agnes, who dream of having a mother one day, believe that Gru will fall in love with Lucy. Gru denies it, saying his relationship with Lucy is only professional.

Despite holding Eduardo as his prime suspect, Gru agrees to pursue other leads, including the shop of wig merchant Floyd Eaglesan, where Lucy discovers traces of PX-41. After witnessing Eduardo's son Antonio woo Margo and invite everyone to his Cinco de Mayo party, Gru renews his focus on Eduardo. Following a bad blind date in which Lucy helps Gru to escape, the two begin to bond. The next day, the AVL arrests Floyd after finding an almost-empty jar of the mutagen in his shop. Silas closes the investigation and reassigns Lucy to Australia, leaving Gru heartbroken.

At the Cinco de Mayo party, Gru follows Eduardo and discovers that he is indeed El Macho. Having faked his death, El Macho has hired Dr. Nefario, and had abducted most of Gru's Minions, using the stolen PX-41 mutagen to transform them into an army of indestructible and savage purple beasts. El Macho plans to launch rockets full of the evil Minions into major cities to dominate the world. He offers Gru the chance to team up with him, but Gru walks away with the girls. Suspicious, El Macho sends an evil Minion, Kevin, after them.

Lucy, having decided to disobey orders and return home to Gru, arrives at the party right after Gru leaves. Realizing that Lucy and Gru are working for the AVL, El Macho kidnaps her. Dr. Nefario witnesses this and informs Gru of the situation. Gru infiltrates El Macho's fortress with two of his own disguised Minions, but the evil Minions see through the disguise and attack them. Meanwhile, Kevin breaks into Gru's house and attacks Margo and Agnes. They lure him to Gru's lab, where Dr. Nefario arrives with an antidote and turns Kevin normal again. Dr. Nefario puts the antidote in Gru's jelly reserves, and he and the girls hurry to Gru's aid. Gru, Dr. Nefario, the girls, and the surviving Minions use jelly guns to restore all the other evil Minions to their normal state. El Macho threatens to kill Lucy, and uses the PX-41 to become a monster himself, but is defeated by Gru and Dr. Nefario.

Gru starts to rescue Lucy from El Macho's TNT-loaded shark rocket, but El Macho's pet chicken Pollito launches it, sending them toward a volcano. Lucy accepts Gru's invitation for a date, and they jump into the ocean before the rocket explodes in the volcano. 147 dates later, Gru and Lucy get married, giving Margo, Edith, and Agnes a mother.

Voice cast

 Steve Carell as Gru, a former supervillain turned dad (and later a member of the Anti-Villain League).
 Kristen Wiig as Lucy Wilde, an Anti-Villain League agent and Gru's love interest and later, wife.
 Benjamin Bratt as Eduardo Pérez / El Macho, the owner of Salsa & Salsa, a Mexican restaurant in the Paradise Mall, and the mastermind behind the theft of the PX-41 serum. Al Pacino was originally cast in the role and had recorded all his lines, but left the film due to creative differences.
 Miranda Cosgrove as Margo, the eldest of the three girls.
 Russell Brand as Dr. Nefario, Gru's elderly, hearing-impaired gadget man.
 Steve Coogan as Silas Ramsbottom, the director of the Anti-Villain League.
 Ken Jeong as Floyd Eaglesan, the owner of Eagle Hair Club, a wig store in the Paradise Mall.

Additionally, Elsie Fisher voices Agnes, the youngest of the three girls, Dana Gaier voices Edith, the middle of the three girls, Moisés Arias voices Antonio Pérez, Margo's first love interest and Eduardo's son, Nasim Pedrad voices Jillian, Gru's irritating matchmaking neighbor who wants Gru to date her friends, Kristen Schaal voices Shannon, Jillian's superficial friend, and Pierre Coffin voices the Minions. According to Coffin, he lent his voice to 899 Minions.

Other cast members include Chris Renaud as additional Minions and an Italian waiter, Vanessa Bayer as a flight attendant, and Nickolai Stoilov as the Arctic lab guards.

Production

Development
Chris Meledandri, CEO of Illumination Entertainment, said in July 2010 that a sequel was in the works. In June 2011, Universal Pictures announced that the sequel would be released on July 3, 2013. Meledandri confirmed in February 2012 that they had started working on the film.

Casting
In October 2011, The Hollywood Reporter reported that Javier Bardem was negotiating to voice a villain, named El Macho, but the negotiations failed. By February 2012, Al Pacino had joined the cast to voice the villain. In April 2012, producers confirmed that Steve Carell, Russell Brand, Miranda Cosgrove, Dana Gaier and Elsie Fisher were returning to reprise their roles. Kristen Wiig, who voiced Miss Hattie in the first film, voices Lucy Wilde, an agent of the Anti-Villain League who recruits Gru to track and take down a tough, Mexican villain named El Macho. Steve Coogan joined the cast as Silas Ramsbottom, the head of the Anti-Villain League.

In May 2013, producers announced that Al Pacino had left the film over creative differences about how his character should come to life. At the time of his departure, Pacino's character had already been fully voiced and animated. Chris Renaud, co-director of the film, commented on Pacino's departure: "So we don't want an unhappy actor, and we want something that is well-realized on all sides. If you don't see eye to eye, sometimes it's easier to (part company) and move on from there." Benjamin Bratt, who had already been considered before Pacino, stepped in to voice Eduardo. Chris Meledandri, producer of the film, admitted that he was not "aware of any of the major animated films of the last 15 years that has brought an actor in at such a late stage". Due to the finished animation, Bratt had to match his timing exactly to the character's mouth movement. Initially, during his five-day recording, he tried to imitate Pacino's voice, but found it impossible, saying "no one can out-Al Pacino Al Pacino". He ended up only using Pacino as an inspiration, and resolved to go with his own interpretation of the character. His work was commended by Variety, saying: "You'd never guess he wasn't the filmmakers' first choice."

Animation
The animation was developed in Paris, France by Illumination Mac Guff using Autodesk Maya, over 400 to 650 artists worked on the sequel, in contrast of the team of 100 artists the first film required.

One of the biggest challenges for the animation team was creating visual effects (such as water and jelly), which led to the crashing and replacement of some of the studio's drives.

Music

Following the success of the predecessor's music, the composers, Heitor Pereira and Pharrell Williams collaborated again for the music of Despicable Me 2. The soundtrack to the film, titled Despicable Me 2: Original Motion Picture Soundtrack was released on July 2, 2013, through Back Lot Music. The album featured eight songs and 16 score tracks, combining for 24 tracks in the album. The songs consisted of three original and five incorporated tracks, with two of the songs were already featured in the predecessor.

Williams' original song "Happy" was the only single from the album, released five months after the film's release, on November 21, 2013. It was accompanied by a 24-hour music video upon release, a first for any film, which received a viral response, contributing to the song's global success. It topped the charts in over 19 countries, became the best-selling song in United Kingdom and United States, with over 1.5 and 6.45 million copies sold in 2014, and was nominated for Best Original Song at the 86th Academy Awards.

The soundtrack additionally debuted at US Billboard 200 in number 86, while also featured at the Independent Albums (number 19) and Top Soundtracks (top-three) charts. It also listed in Official Charts Company's Compilation Chart (number 48) and Soundtracks Chart (number 8). A single "Just a Cloud Away" released on March 25, 2022, eight years after the film and soundtrack release.

Marketing and release
In March 2013, a blimp dressed to appear as a Minion, named "Despicablimp", in which Universal and Van Wagner Communications owns an American Blimp Corporation A-150 model, traveled through the United States for a  tour to promote the film's release. Universal Pictures partnered the film with licensing and promotional partners valued at an unprecedented $200—$250 million in the next three years. One of the partners was McDonald's, which included in its Happy Meals various Minion toys, some of them unique to a specific country. To take advantage of banana-loving Minions, Chiquita Brands International ran various sweepstakes, and a Minion, voiced by Pierre Coffin, performed the song "Chiquita Banana" in the film. Thinkway Toys released various toys and figures, and Hasbro made special games.

Despicable Me 2 debuted on June 5, 2013, at Event Cinemas in Bondi Junction, Sydney, Australia, followed by a premiere on June 12, at the Annecy International Animated Film Festival. In the United States, the film's premiere took place on June 22, at the Universal CityWalk in Los Angeles, and was released in theaters on July 3. It was digitally re-mastered into IMAX 3D format and released in select international IMAX theatres.

As with the first film, which did not have a theatrical release in China, the film's distributor Universal Pictures had troubles releasing the sequel. When it was reported in July 2013 that the film had been denied a theatrical release in China, then the second-largest film market in the world, some analysts attributed this to the protection of locally produced animation. There were also rumors that the film's release was banned in China because the film's minions too much resembled former Chinese president Jiang Zemin. China's Film Bureau was "furious" about the negative comments, stating that the film was not submitted for censorship approval. In fact, there was reportedly a "commercial conflict" between Universal and Edko Films, the film's local distributor, over which titles are to be imported. Edko had decided that the film "would not do well in China and decided against using one of the precious quota slots for the film." In December 2013, a few weeks after the Universal Pictures' announcement that it would open a Beijing office, it was reported that Despicable Me 2 would be theatrically released in China on January 10, 2014.

Universal Pictures Home Entertainment released Despicable Me 2 for digital download on November 26, and on Blu-ray and DVD on December 10. Physical copies contain three short films: Puppy, Panic in the Mailroom, and Training Wheels.

Reception

Box office
Despicable Me 2 earned $368 million in the United States and Canada and $602.7 million in other territories, for a worldwide total of $970.8 million. It was the third-highest-grossing film of 2013. Deadline Hollywood calculated the film's net profit as $394.5 million, placing it third on their list of 2013's "Most Valuable Blockbusters". With a budget of $76 million, the film is the most profitable film in the 101-year history of Universal.

The film was released with The Lone Ranger on July 3, 2013, leading into the Independence Day holiday weekend. Despicable Me 2 earned $35 million on its first day, including $4.7 million from Tuesday night previews. It made $24.5 million the following Thursday, the third highest ever total for the holiday behind Spider-Man: Far From Home ($25.1 million in 2019) and Transformers ($29 million in 2007). The film debuted earning $142.1 million from 3,957 theaters, and grossed $82.5 million on its three-day opening weekend. Its second weekend earnings dropped by 56 percent to $43 million, and followed by another $25 million the third weekend. Despicable Me 2 completed its theatrical run in the United States and Canada on January 16, 2014.

Worldwide, on its first weekend, Despicable Me 2 opened only in Australia with $6.66 million, ahead of Monsters University (2013) which opened on the same weekend. The film set an opening-day record in Latvia. In total, it opened at number one in 67 territories, and set opening-weekend records among animated films in Latin America, Indonesia, Malaysia, Philippines, Vietnam, and Lebanon, as well as opening-weekend records among all films in South Africa and Venezuela. In Japan, it topped the box office ($3.3 million) beating Elsyium (2013). The film remained in the first position at the box office for two consecutive weekends during July 2013. The film's largest openings occurred in the United Kingdom ($22.5 million), China ($15.4 million), and Mexico ($14.9 million). In total earnings, its largest markets were the United Kingdom ($72.2 million), China ($53.0 million), and Mexico ($47.7 million).

Critical response
Its critical consensus reads, "Despicable Me 2 offers plenty of eye-popping visual inventiveness and a number of big laughs." Metacritic (which uses a weighted average) assigned Despiable Me 2 a score of 62 out of 100 based on 39 critics, indicating "generally favorable reviews". Audiences polled by CinemaScore gave the film an average grade of "A" on an A+ to F scale.

Michael Phillips of the Chicago Tribune gave the film two and a half stars out of four, saying "Steve Carell's Slavic inflections as Gru do the trick, as before. Wiig's clever hesitations and comic timing help save the day." Michael Rechtshaffen of The Hollywood Reporter gave the film a negative review, saying "The new edition doesn't quite catch that inspired spark." Stephen Whitty of The Star-Ledger gave the film three stars out of four, saying "Not only a fun cartoon but—that rare thing—a sequel which actually improves on the original." Soren Anderson of The Seattle Times gave the film two and a half stars out of four, saying "It's fun. It's cheerful. It's lollipop colorful. Best of all, it features lots of minion mischief, which guarantees plenty of laughs. But what it doesn't have is an edge."

Stephen Holden of The New York Times gave the film two and a half stars out of five, saying "It is consistently diverting and so cute you'll want to pet it. Yet it is also weightless and lacks a center." Tirdad Derakhshani of The Philadelphia Inquirer gave the film two and a half stars out of five, saying "If you're looking for quality prepackaged, predigested Hollywood family fun this summer, you could do a lot worse than Despicable Me 2." Alonso Duralde of TheWrap gave the film a negative review, saying "The minions are still wacky scene-stealers—and once again, we don't get nearly enough of them—but Gru and his daughters have been blanded down to bad-sitcom level." Claudia Puig of USA Today gave the film two stars out of four, saying "With its predecessor having made a whopping $540 million globally, it's no wonder that Universal saw fit to order a sequel. But it's not enough just to trot out legions of minions and cobble together a plot. Audiences deserve more imagination and inventiveness than this wan recycling." Owen Gleiberman of Entertainment Weekly gave the film a 'C' grade, saying "By the end, every child in the audience will want his or her own monster-minion toy. Adults will just regret the way that Despicable Me 2 betrays the original film's devotion to bad-guy gaiety."

Tom Russo of The Boston Globe gave the film a positive review, saying "The scope of the 'toon espionage-adventure goings-on is surprisingly limited. But the filmmakers so clearly love working on these characters, their creative joy is infectious." Stephanie Merry of The Washington Post gave the film three stars out of four, saying "The animation is beguiling, particularly when Lucy drives her car into the ocean, transforming it into a submarine that scoots around sharks and fish." Peter Debruge of Variety gave the film a positive review, saying "While not quite as charming or unique as the original, Despicable Me 2 comes awfully close, extending co-directors Chris Renaud and Pierre Coffin's delightfully silly sensibility to a bit larger universe." Peter Hartlaub of the San Francisco Chronicle gave the film three stars out of four, saying "It's a credit that the writing can be so funny in the moment, that it takes time to realize there's no cohesive story, zero dramatic tension and nary a practical lesson for either the characters in the film or the people watching in the theater."

Mary Pols of Time gave the film a positive review, saying "As a sequel it stands level with the first film, and may have the edge on it." Peter Travers of Rolling Stone gave the film three stars out of four, saying "Co-directors Chris Renaud and Pierre Coffin, who do Minion voices expertly, never let up on the laughs. A fart joke in 3-D may not be three times as wacky, but the high spirits of Despicable Me 2 are irresistible fun." A.A. Dowd of The A.V. Club gave the film a 'C' grade, saying "What's missing—and this was the crucial component of part one—is a little sour to undercut the sweet. Like its protagonist, a bad guy gone boringly good, Despicable Me 2 has no edge. It's fatally nice and insufficiently naughty."

Accolades

At the 86th Academy Awards, Despicable Me 2 received nominations for Best Animated Feature and Best Original Song. Among the film's nominations include ten Annie Awards (winning one), a British Academy Film Award, two Critics' Choice Movie Awards, and a Golden Globe Award.

Sequels and prequels

Despicable Me 2 was followed by Despicable Me 3 (2017) and the upcoming Despicable Me 4 (2024). The second film's cast, including Carell, Wiig, Coogan, Cosgrove, and Gaier, reprised their roles, alongside a new character voiced by Carell. Nev Scharrel was appointed to the role of Agnes in Despicable Me 3. Minions (2015) and Minions: The Rise of Gru (2022) were also released after Despicable Me 2. The films chronicle the history between the Minions and Gru.

References

External links
 
 
 
 

2010s American animated films
2010s children's comedy films
2010s English-language films
2013 3D films
2013 computer-animated films
3D animated films
American 3D films
American children's animated comedy films
American comedy films
American computer-animated films
American sequel films
Annie Award winners
Despicable Me
Films directed by Chris Renaud
Films directed by Pierre Coffin
Films produced by Chris Meledandri
Films produced by Janet Healy
Films scored by Heitor Pereira
Films scored by Pharrell Williams
Films set in 2013
Films set in California
Films with screenplays by Cinco Paul and Ken Daurio
Illumination (company) animated films
IMAX films
Universal Pictures animated films
Films about father–daughter relationships